Damat Mehmed Adil Ferid Pasha (‎ 1853 – 6 October 1923), known simply as Damat Ferid Pasha, was an Ottoman liberal statesman, who held the office of Grand Vizier, the de facto prime minister of the Ottoman Empire, during two periods under the reign of the last Ottoman Sultan Mehmed VI, the first time between 4 March 1919 and 2 October 1919 and the second time between 5 April 1920 and 21 October 1920. Officially, he was brought to the office a total of five times, since his cabinets were recurrently dismissed under various pressures and he had to present new ones. Because of his involvement in the Treaty of Sèvres, his collaboration with the occupying Allied powers, and his readiness to acknowledge atrocities against the Armenians, he became an unpopular figure in Turkey and emigrated to Europe at the end of the Greco-Turkish War.

Biography 
Some claim that Mehmed Adil Ferid was born in 1853 in Constantinople as the son of Izet Efendi, who was born in Potoci near Taşlıca (now Pljevlja, Montenegro). He was a member of the Ottoman Council of State (Şûrâ-yı Devlet) and Governor of Beirut and Sidon in 1857, but there is no clear evidence about this information. In 1879, Ferid was enrolled at the Schools of Islamic charities in Sidon. He served several positions in Ottoman administration before he entered the foreign office of the Ottoman Empire and was assigned to different posts at embassies in Paris, Berlin, St. Petersburg, and London. He married a daughter of Abdülmecid I, Mediha Sultan, which earned him the title of "damat" ("bridegroom" to the Ottoman dynasty). Like his father, he became a member of the Şûrâ-yı Devlet in 1884 and earned the title of vizier soon afterwards. Refusing the post of ambassador in London by the sultan Abdülhamid II, he resigned from public service and returned only after two decades, in 1908, as a member of the Senate of the Ottoman Parliament.

He was one of the founding members of the Freedom and Accord Party in 1911, favoring liberalism and more regional autonomy within the Empire, in opposition to the Committee of Union and Progress. On 11 June 1919, Damat Ferid Pasha officially confessed to massacres against Armenians and was a key figure and initiator of the war crime trials held directly after World War I to condemn to death the chief perpetrators of the genocide, who were notably Committee of Union and Progress members and long-time rivals of his own Freedom and Accord Party.

His first office as grand vizier coincided with the Occupation of Smyrna by the Greek army and the ensuing tumultuous period. He assumed as the successor of Ahmet Tevfik Pasha on the 4 March 1919 and on the 9 March initiated a campaign of arrests of former ministers like Halil Menteşe, Ali Fethi Okyar and Ali Münif Yeğenağa amongst others. Ferid Pasha was an ardent anglophile, who hoped to receive less harsh peace terms by presenting the Ottoman Empire as a more cooperative partner in the Eastern Mediterranean than Greece. He was known to say "After God, me and the Sultan relay on England". He was dismissed on 30 September 1919, but after two short-lived governments under Ali Rıza Pasha and Hulusi Salih Pasha, the Sultan Mehmet VI had to call him back to form a new government on 5 April 1920. He remained as Grand Vizier until 17 October 1920, forming two different cabinets in between.

His second office coincided with the closure of the Ottoman Parliament under pressure from the British and French forces of occupation. Along with four other notables, he agreed to sign the Treaty of Sèvres, comprising disastrous conditions for Turkey, which caused an uproar of reaction towards him. He was not one of the signatories of the Treaty itself, but together with the three signatories he would be nevertheless stripped of his citizenship by the Turkish Grand National Assembly during the week of the treaty's signature and would head the list of 150 persona non grata of Turkey after the Turkish War of Independence. Ferid Pasha retorted by becoming increasingly hostile to the new nationalist movement led by Mustafa Kemal Pasha, which was centered in Ankara; Damat Ferid Pasha began to increasingly collaborate with the Allied occupation forces.

Even after his dismissal, and the formation of a new Ottoman Government under Ahmet Tevfik Pasha, he remained widely disliked (especially in Anatolia) and with the Turkish victory in the Greco-Turkish War (1919–1922), he fled to Europe. He died in Nice, France, on 6 October 1923, the same day that Kemalist troops recovered Constantinople, and was buried in the city of Sidon, Lebanon.

See also
 List of Ottoman Grand Viziers
 Chronology of the Turkish War of Independence

References

20th-century Grand Viziers of the Ottoman Empire
1853 births
1923 deaths
Politicians from Istanbul
Political people from the Ottoman Empire
Pashas
Government ministers of the Ottoman Empire
Damats
Ministers of Foreign Affairs of the Ottoman Empire
Members of the Senate of the Ottoman Empire